Roland Jay Thomas (June 9, 1900 – April 18, 1967), also known as R. J. Thomas, was a left-wing leader of the American automobile workers union in the 1930s and 1940s.  He grew up in eastern Ohio and attended the   College of Wooster for two years. The need to help support his family caused him to leave college and go to work. In 1923, he moved to Detroit, where he worked in a number of automobile plants.

He became active in efforts to organize the automobile industry and was the president of Chrysler Local 7 when it affiliated with the United Auto Workers (UAW) in 1936. He was a leader of the 1937 Chrysler sit-down strike and that same year was elected a vice president of the UAW. He assumed the presidency in 1938 after the president, Homer Martin, was ousted.

He was president until 1946. During this period, the UAW developed into a dynamic, stable union. He lost the presidency to Walter Reuther in 1946, but was elected first vice president. Within the UAW, Thomas had led a CPUSA-affiliated faction that supported the Soviet Union, while Reuther led a liberal and progressive faction that opposed the Soviet Union. During the WWII and until 1946 in the UAW, the Communists had outnumbered the liberals in the Executive Committee; but by 1947, as U.S.-Soviet tensions grew, workers' support of the Communists waned. A series of bitter internal disputes led to Thomas losing the office of the vice presidency in the following year's election, with most of the leading Communists replaced, in what became known as "the biggest setback of all time for the Communists in the American Labor Movement." After his defeat in 1947, he was named assistant to Congress of Industrial Organizations (CIO) president Philip Murray. With the merger of the AFL and CIO in 1955, he served under George Meany until his retirement in 1964 due to ill health.

He was married to Mildred Wettergren on August 7, 1937. and they had one child, Frank. R. J. Thomas died in Muskegon, Michigan, in 1967.

References

Further reading
 Barnard, John,  American Vanguard: A History of the United Auto Workers, 1935–1970 (2004) passim.
 Fink, Gary M. Biographical Dictionary of American Labor Leaders(Greenwood Press, 1974). p. 352.

 Kraus, Henry. Heroes of Unwritten Story: The UAW, 1934–1939 (University of Illinois Press, 1993). 

 Halpern, Martin. "The 1939 UAW convention: Turning point for communist power in the auto union?" Labor History 33.2 (1992): 190-216.

 Howe, Irving, and B. J. Widick. "The UAW and Its Leaders." The Virginia Quarterly Review 25.1 (1949): 34-47 online

 Lichtenstein, Nelson. Walter Reuther: The Most Dangerous Man in Detroit (1995). a major scholarly biography; online

1900 births
1967 deaths
People from East Palestine, Ohio
Presidents of the United Auto Workers
Trade unionists from Ohio